La Spagnola (Italian: "The Spanish Woman") is a 2001 comedy drama Australian film directed by Steve Jacobs. It was Australia's submission to the 74th Academy Awards for the Academy Award for Best Foreign Language Film, but was not accepted as a nominee.

Synopsis
Lola is a fiery Spanish wife and mother living in small-town sixties Australia. When her husband leaves her for a young blonde, taking their life savings with him, and her teenage daughter begins to rebel against her strict rules, Lola come into her own.

Box office
La Spagnola grossed $477,197 at the box office in Australia.

See also

Cinema of Australia
List of submissions to the 74th Academy Awards for Best Foreign Language Film

References

External links

La Spagnola at Oz Movies

2001 films
2001 comedy-drama films
Australian comedy-drama films
2000s Spanish-language films
Films set in 1960
Films scored by Cezary Skubiszewski
2000s Australian films